Kochkovatka is a rural locality (a selo) and the administrative center of Kochkovatsky Selsoviet, Kharabalinsky District, Astrakhan Oblast, Russia. The population was 1,597 as of 2010. There are 20 streets.

Geography 
Kochkovatka is located 26 km northwest of Kharabali (the district's administrative centre) by road. Sasykoli is the nearest rural locality.

References 

Rural localities in Kharabalinsky District